Kachera are an undergarment for the lower body that is specially tailored for shalwar with a tie-knot naala or naada  (drawstring) worn by fully initiated Sikhs.  They are similar to European boxer shorts in appearance. It is one of the five Sikh articles of faith called the Five Ks, and was given from Guru Gobind Singh at the Baisakhi Amrit Sanskar in 1699. Kachera have been worn by initiated Sikhs (Khalsa) since a mandatory religious commandment given by Guru Gobind Singh, the tenth Guru of Sikhism, in 1699. Both male and female Sikhs wear similar undergarments. This is one of five articles of faith—collectively called "Kakkars"—that form the external, visible symbols clearly and outwardly displaying one's commitment and dedication to the order(Hukam) of the tenth master.
 
The Sikh Code of Conduct states "For a Sikh, there is no restriction or requirement as to dress except that he must wear Kachera and turban." Kachera is a drawer type fastened by a fitted string round the waist, very often worn as an underwear. This Kakkar was given by Gobind Singh to remind his Sikhs that they should control their sexual desire, Kaam (lust). The kachera is above-the-knee underwear meant to give a feeling of dignity, modesty, and honour to the person who wears it. The garment is usually made from white, lightweight-cotton material. It serves to cover the genitalia, as well as to remind the Sikh of the Guru's commandment to think of members of the opposite sex as he or she would think of immediate family and not as objects of lust. The kacchera is secured and tied with a "nara" (drawstring). This serves as another reminder that when one is untying the drawstring one is given time to think about what one is about to do.

The kachera is the Guru's gift and it reminds the Sikhs of the Guru's message regarding the control of the Five Evils, especially lust. It serves its purpose efficiently and effectively and is easy to fabricate, maintain, wash, and carry compared to other conventional undergarments, such as the dhoti, etc.

See also
 Similar Indian clothes
 Kaupinam
 Langot
 Related Indian clothes
 Clothing in India
 Dhoti
 Lungi
 Similar foreign clothes
 Breechcloth
 Fundoshi
 Mawashi
 Perizoma
 Subligaculum
 Related foreign clothes
 Tallit katan
 Temple garment: religious undergarments worn by many members of the Church of Jesus Christ of Latter-day Saints

References

Non-clerical religious clothing
Punjabi words and phrases
Sikh religious clothing
Sikh terminology
Undergarments